Julian Kuo (born 24 June 1961) is a Taiwanese political scientist and politician who first served in the Legislative Yuan from 2002 to 2008 and was reappointed to the office in 2016.

Academic career
Upon graduation from National Taiwan University, Kuo was named an Eisenhower Fellow and furthered his education in the United States, where he earned a Ph.D in political science from Yale University. He returned to Taiwan, and began teaching political science at Soochow University in 1993.

Political career
Kuo was a member of the Democratic Progressive Party's Formosa faction and later switched affiliations to the New Tide faction.

By 1998, Kuo became the executive director of the party's Policy Research and Coordinating Committee. After he had stepped down, Kuo and Lin Cho-shui proposed that the DPP amend its charter to recognize the Republic of China as Taiwan. The initiative failed, and no revisions were made. Shortly after Chen Shui-bian's election to the presidency in 2000, Kuo pushed for cross-party alliances and a coalition government to be formed. However, in 2001, Kuo stated that he was opposed to proposals that the Democratic Progressive Party form a coalition government, instead favoring a scenario in which the DPP disbanded and rewrote its party charter to attract a wider base before reregistering as a political party. Kuo was first elected to the Legislative Yuan later that year as a member of the DPP, due to the efforts the party had made to ensure a competitive vote distribution in northern Taiwan by asking supporters to vote for candidates based on the last number in voters' identification cards. In his first term Kuo backed a proposal to ban active politicians from owning media outlets and hosting programs. Kuo was tapped to defend the cross-strait relations referendum in March 2004, and faced Jaw Shaw-kong. In his successful December reelection bid, Kuo received NT$26.35 million in political donations, the third highest total of that electoral cycle. In 2006, Kuo skipped a party debate on China policy in protest, as the Chen administration had announced changes without reaching out to the Legislative Yuan. Kuo switched districts for the 2008 legislative elections, choosing to run in Taipei 3 against John Chiang, and lost.

When Taiwan signed the Economic Cooperation Framework Agreement with China in 2010, Kuo was named the spokesman of a DPP-convened committee against the agreement. Kuo participated in a primary for Taipei 2 in 2011, but was not selected as DPP candidate for the constituency. He was invited to speak at a political forum held in Hong Kong in August 2016, but authorities there denied him a visa. Kuo returned to the legislature in September, filling Wellington Koo's seat after Koo had resigned to lead the Ill-gotten Party Assets Settlement Committee.

Political stances
Kuo has stated "I'm culturally Chinese but politically not," described Lee Teng-hui's China policy as "fitful" and "reactive", reiterated support for continued dialogue between the two sides of the Taiwan Strait, and has repeatedly advocated for the Democratic Progressive Party to suspend Taiwan independence as a core value. These actions have led to characterization of his political beliefs as supportive of China, a description he regards as inaccurate.

Kuo has sharply criticized the Economic Cooperation Framework Agreement signed in 2010, calling it "a travesty of an agreement" that would leave Taiwan too economically dependent on China if the mainland forced other nations to back away from free trade agreements with Taiwan.

Kuo is an occasional contributor to the Taipei Times.

References

1961 births
Living people
Democratic Progressive Party Members of the Legislative Yuan
Taipei Members of the Legislative Yuan
Members of the 5th Legislative Yuan
Members of the 6th Legislative Yuan
Members of the 9th Legislative Yuan
Yale University alumni
National Taiwan University alumni
Academic staff of Soochow University (Taiwan)
Politicians of the Republic of China on Taiwan from Kaohsiung
Party List Members of the Legislative Yuan
Taiwanese political scientists